I Can Jump Puddles is a 1981 Australian television mini-series based on the 1955 autobiographical series of the same name by author Alan Marshall. Adapted for television by screenwriters Cliff Green and Roger Simpson, the series starred Lewis Fitz-Gerald, Adam Garnett, Tony Barry, Julie Hamilton, Ann Henderson, Lesley Baker, Olivia Brown, Debra Lawrance and Darren MacDonald.

Several prominent television actors also had supporting roles including Lisa Aldenhoven (The Young Doctors), Kaarin Fairfax (Bed of Roses), Maurie Fields (Skyways), Terry Gill (Bluey), Reg Gorman (Fergus McPhail), Matthew King (Dogstar), Julie Nihill (Blue Heelers), Maureen Edwards and Dennis Miller (A Country Practice) and Jason Donovan and Cliff Ellen (Neighbours).

A large part of supporting and minor roles also featured cameo appearances by cast members of Prisoner such as Esme Melville (Beryl Hudson), Peter Curtin (Ian Mahoney), Ian Smith (Ted Douglas), Christine Amor (Jean Vernon), Fiona Spence (Vera Bennett), Edward Hepple (Sid Humphrey), Sigrid Thornton (Roslyn Coulson), Leila Hayes (Jeannie Baxter), Sandy Gore (Kay White), Mary Ward (Mum Brooks), Anne Phelan (Myra Desmond). Future cast members included Billie Hammerberg (May Collins) and Pepe Trevor (Lexie Patterson).

Plot
Based on Alan Marshall's three-part autobiography I Can Jump Puddles (1955), This is the Grass (1962) and In Mine Own Heart (1963), the film tells of Marshall's childhood growing up in rural Victoria around the turn of the century. Contracting polio soon after attending school, the story retells the obstacles he faced as a child in trying to overcome his disability. Later as an adult, he encounters prejudice due to his debilitating disease while looking for work in Melbourne.

Cast and characters

Main characters

 Lewis Fitz-Gerald as Alan Marshall
 Tony Barry as Alan's Father
 Julie Hamilton as Alan's Mother
 Adam Garnett as Alan (Aged 11)
 Ann Henderson as Mary
 Lesley Baker as Matron
 Bruce Kerr as Dr. Robertson
 Brian Hannan as Alec
 Olivia Brown as Prostitute Maisie
 Clare Binney as Prostitute Filsy
 Earl Francis as George
 Debra Lawrance as Nurse Conrad
 Darren MacDonald as Steve

Supporting characters

 Lisa Aldenhoven as Mamie
 Christine Amor as Rose
 Peter Curtin as Flagger
 Jason Donovan as Freddy
 Maureen Edwards as Mrs. Carmichael
 Cliff Ellen as Drunk
 Kaarin Fairfax as Rene
 Maurie Fields as Spruiker
 Terry Gill as Arthur
 Sandy Gore as Miss. Claws
 Reg Gorman as Arthur
 Billie Hammerberg as Mrs. Hale
 Leila Hayes as Miss. Bryce
 Edward Hepple as Tom
 Matthew King as Urger
 Esme Melville as Miss. Forbes
 Dennis Miller as Gunner
 Julie Nihill as Young woman
 Anne Phelan as Lay preacher
 Ian Smith as Mr. Slade
 Fiona Spence as Mrs. Wilson
 Elizabeth Stevenson as Night sister
 Peter Thompson as Businessman
 Sigrid Thornton as Mabel
 Pepe Trevor as Pretty girl
 Mary Ward as Mrs. Birdsworth

Reception
The series was first aired on 7 June 1981 and ran for nine episodes. It was shown again two years later before being released on DVD by Roadshow Home Entertainment in August 2005.

The series ran in the UK on BBC 2 in 1983.

Awards
Adam Garnett, who played the 11-year-old Alan Marshall, won a Logie Award for Best Performance by a Juvenile in 1981.

References

External links
I Can Jump Puddles at Screen Australia
 
I Can Jump Puddles at Australian Screen Online

1981 Australian television series debuts
1981 Australian television series endings
Australian Broadcasting Corporation original programming
1980s Australian television miniseries
Television shows set in Australia
Television shows based on Australian novels
Australian drama television series